Vladimir Raimovich Yezhurov (born 24 March 1960) is a Russian football manager and a former player. He also holds Tajikistani citizenship. He is an assistant manager with Astana.

External links
 

1960 births
Living people
Soviet footballers
Russian football managers
FC Yenisey Krasnoyarsk managers
FC Belshina Bobruisk managers
Association footballers not categorized by position